Tumelo Nhlapo (born 20 January 1988) is a South African soccer player.

Career
Nhlapo was born in Parys. He made his senior debut for Bloemfontein Celtic on 8 August 2007 against Mamelodi Sundowns in the South African Premier Division. After 15 senior appearances for Celtic, he was called up to the South African national team squad for the 2008 Africa Cup of Nations but did not play at the tournament. Nhlapo left Bloemfontein Celtic after refusing to sign a contract extension ahead of the 2010–11 season.

References

1988 births
South African soccer players
Association football defenders
Association football midfielders
Living people
Bloemfontein Celtic F.C. players
Association football utility players
2008 Africa Cup of Nations players
South Africa youth international soccer players
Soccer players from the Free State (province)
People from Parys